The Best of A Flock of Seagulls is a compilation album by new wave band A Flock of Seagulls, released in 1986 by Jive Records. It is the first official compilation album released by the band.

Track listing
All tracks written by M. Score, A. Score, F. Maudsley, and P. Reynolds; except where indicated

Reception
Writing for AllMusic, Stephen Thomas Erlewine wrote that the albums proves "they did do some good new nomantic [sic] synth pop" and that the album "contain[s] all of the group's best material...while new wave fetishists will likely go for the actual albums anyway, most listeners will be more than satisfied with this."

References 

A Flock of Seagulls compilation albums
1987 compilation albums